Halwani and the variant Halawani sometimes with the definite article -al and -el may refer to:

Halwani
Amr El Halwani (born 1985), Egyptian footballer
Yazan Halwani, Lebanese artist and graffiti artist
Raja Halwani (born 1967), American-Lebanese philosopher

Halawani
Ayman Halawani, now known as Richard Halawani, American entrepreneur and film producer
Mohamed El-Halawani (born 1936), Egyptian rower
Rula Halawani (born 1964), Palestinian photographer and educator